SS Tuscania was built by Fairfield Shipbuilding and Engineering Company, and launched on 4 October 1921 for the Anchor Line.

Building and description
During the First World War, several large liners of Glasgow-based Anchor Line (Henderson Bros) Ltd were lost, including the earlier Tuscania of 1914. Embarking on a replacement programme even before the end of 1918, the replacement Tuscania for the Mediterranean-New York service was built by Fairfield Shipbuilding and Engineering Company at Govan, Glasgow, as yard number 595.

The ship was formally named Tuscania when launched on 4 October 1921, in the midst of the post-war economic slump, when many shipowners, Anchor Line included, had asked builders to slow or suspend building work. Tuscania was not completed until almost a year later; she ran sea trials on 8 September 1922 and was registered at Glasgow with Official Number 146307. As completed, she has capacity for 2462 passengers (267 1st class, 377 2nd and 1818 3rd) and a complement of 342 officers and crew.

History

Anchor Line
Earlier plans to deploy Tuscania on the company's Mediterranean-New York service were changed, and she began her career on the Glasgow-Moville-New York route, leaving the Clyde on her maiden voyage on 15 September 1922. She continued on the North Atlantic, with occasional New York-Mediterranean voyages, until May 1926.

In May 1926, Tuscania was chartered to the Cunard Line for its service between London and New York, via Southampton and Le Havre, and repainted in the charterer's colours. She was returned for service with Anchor Line in 1931. She was later employed on their Liverpool-India service and cruising until sold in 1939 to the Goulandris brothers' General Steam Navigation Company of Greece.

Nea Hellas
Upon arrival in Piraeus on 8 March 1939 the ship was renamed Nea Hellas (Νέα Έλλας, meaning "New Greece") and refitted for service between Piraeus and New York City beginning on 19 May 1939. Service between these two ports was interrupted for the duration of World War II for use as a troopship for Allied soldiers. The ship was renamed New York and placed on a New York to Bremen service in 1955. Due to her age, the ship was retired in 1959 and scrapped in 1961.

Sources

Passenger ships of the United Kingdom
Passenger ships of Greece
Ships of Scotland
1921 ships